Les Cowboys is a 2015 French-Belgian drama film directed by Thomas Bidegain. It was screened in the Directors' Fortnight section at the 2015 Cannes Film Festival.

Cast
 François Damiens as Alain Balland
 Finnegan Oldfield as Georges Balland (Kid) 
  as Nicole Balland
 Ellora Torchia as Shazhana
 John C. Reilly as The American
 Antoine Chappey as Charles 
 Iliana Zabeth as Kelly Balland 
 Mounir Margoum as Ahmed
 Antonia Campbell-Hughes as Emma
 Laure Calamy as Isabelle
 Sam Louwyck as The forger
 Dani Sanchez-Lopez as The European

Accolades

References

External links
 
 

2015 films
2015 drama films
2015 directorial debut films
French drama films
Belgian drama films
2010s French-language films
Films with screenplays by Thomas Bidegain
French-language Belgian films
2010s French films